Carboxynorspermidine decarboxylase (carboxyspermidine decarboxylase, CANSDC, VC1623 (gene)) is an enzyme with systematic name carboxynorspermidine carboxy-lyase (bis(3-aminopropyl)amine-forming). This enzyme catalyses the following chemical reaction

 (1) carboxynorspermidine  bis(3-aminopropyl)amine + CO2
 (2) carboxyspermidine  spermidine + CO2

This enzyme contains pyridoxal 5'-phosphate.

References

External links 
 

EC 4.1.1